Municipal elections were held in the Canadian province of New Brunswick on May 10, 2021. They were originally supposed to be held May 11, 2020, but were postponed one year due to the COVID-19 pandemic in New Brunswick. Furthermore, elections in some municipalities in Northwestern New Brunswick will be held on May 25 due to those areas being under lockdown. Elections will also be held for district education councils and regional health authorities (Horizon Health Network and Vitalité Health Network), plus there are two plebiscites (annexation of the town and parish of Saint-Quentin  and allowing people to own hens for non-commercial purposes in Blacks Harbour). 

Here is a summary of the mayoral races in the largest municipalities in the province and the council races for the three largest cities. Election results will be released on May 25, following the postponed elections in Northwest New Brunswick.

Bathurst
The candidates for mayor are as follows:

Beaubassin East
The candidates for mayor are as follows:

Campbellton
The candidates for mayor are as follows:

Dieppe
The candidates for mayor are as follows:

Edmundston
The race in Edmundston will be held on May 25 due to a lockdown in Northwestern New Brunswick.

The candidates for mayor are as follows:

Fredericton
The candidates are as follows:

Mayor
Candidates
Andrew Brown
Corinne Saunders Hersey - Sociology professor at St. Thomas University.
Mike O'Brien - Incumbent mayor.
Kate Rogers - Ward 11 city councillor.

Results

Fredericton City Council

Grand Falls
The candidates for mayor are as follows:

Miramichi
The candidates for mayor are as follows:

Moncton
The candidates are as follows:

Mayor
Candidates
Dawn Arnold - incumbent mayor
Erik Gingles - runs video-news site Buzzlocal.

Moncton City Council

Oromocto
The candidates for mayor are as follows:

Quispamsis
The candidates for mayor are as follows:

Riverview
The candidates for mayor are as follows:

Rothesay
The candidates for mayor are as follows:

Sackville
The candidates for mayor are as follows:

Saint John
The candidates are as follows:

Mayor
Candidates
Darrell Bastarache - Landscaper, noted for his controversial statements and support for conspiracy theories.
Donna Reardon - Ward 3 councillor, dietitian and medical administrator.  
Mel Vincent Jr. - Home builder and real estate broker. Son of longtime councillor Mel Vincent Sr. Ran for the Progressive Conservative Party of New Brunswick in the 2003 provincial election. 
Howard Yeomans - Retired accountant. Ran for mayor in 2016, finishing last with 213 votes.

Results

Saint John City Council

Shediac
The candidates for mayor are as follows:

Tracadie
The candidates for mayor are as follows:

Woodstock
The candidates for mayor are as follows:

See also
 Administrative divisions of New Brunswick
 Elections in Canada

References

Municipal elections in New Brunswick
New Brunswick municipal
2021 in New Brunswick
May 2021 events in Canada